Sidney Diamond (born 7 July 1986), previously known by the stage name Young Sid, is a New Zealand rapper.

Biography
Sid Diamond was born in South Auckland, New Zealand and later moved to Manukau City, Auckland. He is of Cook Island and Māori descent, and was raised in the Manukau suburb of Ōtara. He used his aunt's address to attend Papatoetoe High School. Diamond's father, Vincent George, was the president of a gang called the Tribesmen, and his mother, Victoria, was an alcoholic who died of lung cancer in 2009. His older brother, Karlos, who is currently imprisoned, was an aspiring rapper under the name Mr Sicc, and a member of an Ōtara gang called Bad Troublesome Ward. At a young age, Diamond was arrested twice for fighting, and carried weapons such as a knife and an axe, but said in a 2009 interview that Karlos worked to prevent him from getting involved with gangs.

Sid first became attracted to American hip hop after listening to Karlos' copy of the 1988 N.W.A single "Gangsta Gangsta." He recorded his first song at the age of eleven, and was part of a short-lived group called The Murder Squad.

Career
Diamond formed hip-hop trio Smashproof in 2005 with members Tyree and Deach, and they signed a contract with Move The Crowd Records (a subsidiary of Universal) during his first semester of university; he dropped out shortly thereafter in order to pursue his music career full-time. His solo debut, The Truth, was released on Move The Crowd in 2007, and featured a guest appearance by Chamillionaire. He spent three weeks in New York recording the tracks, many of which were produced in Croatia, France, and Auckland. The album would then go on to debut at No. 27 in its lone week on the RIANZ top-40 album charts on 10 September, and won Urban Album of the Year honors at the 2008 Māori Music Awards. However, he came under controversy in February 2008 when he appeared in a music video for the track "Put Your Colourz On", which featured South Auckland street gang members.

His first album with Smashproof, titled The Weekend, was released in March 2009. The featured single, "Brother," broke a 23-year-old record for the longest consecutive run at number one by a New Zealand-based act on the country's singles chart. Sid was the opening act for Ice Cube's Straight Outta Compton Tour concert in Manukau City on 22 August 2007.

In 2010, Diamond released his second album, What Doesn't Kill Me..., which charted for eight weeks and won him his second Urban Album of the Year at the Māori Music Awards.

Discography

Albums

Singles

Mixtape Appearances

Other guest appearances

Awards and nominations

Nesian Vibes Awards

Māori Music Awards

New Zealand Music Awards

References

External links

 Official MySpace page
 Music videos
 Amplifier.co.nz

1986 births
New Zealand people of Cook Island descent
New Zealand hip hop
New Zealand rappers
Living people
People from Auckland
People educated at Papatoetoe High School